Earthly Delights is the fifth studio album by the noise rock band Lightning Bolt. It was released on October 13, 2009, by Load Records.

Track listing

Personnel
Brian Chippendale – drums and vocals
Brian Gibson – bass guitar

References

External links
 Lightning Bolt official website
 Lightning Bolt at Load Records

2009 albums
Lightning Bolt (band) albums
Load Records albums